Clay Township is a township in Wayne County, Iowa, USA.

History
Clay Township is named for Kentucky statesman Henry Clay.

References

Townships in Wayne County, Iowa
Townships in Iowa